Middletown station is an Amtrak train station on the Keystone Corridor in Middletown, Dauphin County in the U.S. state of Pennsylvania. The station is served by Amtrak's Keystone Service between New York City and Harrisburg. The former low-level station was built in 1990, but a relocated station with a high-level platform opened on January 10, 2022.

Services and facilities 
The Middletown station is located at 270 West Emaus Street. In addition to being used by residents of Middletown, the station is also popular with commuters heading to Harrisburg and Philadelphia who utilize its free parking. It sees twenty-three arrivals by the Keystone Service on weekdays, thirteen from both Harrisburg and New York Penn Station, and seven from each on weekends. In fiscal year 2018, the station saw a ridership of 68,022 passengers, a decrease of 0.2 percent from the previous year.

The station consists of a high-level center platform with a covering and seating, with a bridge over the tracks providing access to the platform. As the Middletown station is unstaffed, all tickets from the station need to be pre-paid, or purchased from a conductor on board the train. Capital Area Transit's Route 7 transit bus passes near the station on its route between Middletown, Harrisburg International Airport, and downtown Harrisburg.

History 

A railroad was first laid through Middletown in 1836 by the Harrisburg, Portsmouth, Mount Joy and Lancaster Railroad, which was taken over by the Pennsylvania Railroad in 1850. Only a bare platform was available until brick station was built in 1902. It was demolished in the 1970s. Prior to the introduction of the Keystone Service in 1981, Middletown was served by the Big Apple, the Silverliner Service, and the Keystone. A shelter and concrete platform was built in 1990 by Amtrak. From 1991 to 1995, the Atlantic City Express served the station on weekends.

Relocation 

The Middletown station was in need of being relocated because it was on a superelevated curve and did not comply with the Americans with Disabilities Act of 1990 as well. It was moved from its previous location at Union and Mill streets to a location at Ann Street and Pennsylvania Route 230, between the former station and Harrisburg International Airport. Initial plans called for the station to be moved next to the airport terminal, but this was rejected in favor of keeping the station in the downtown area. By 2013, it was expected to be completed by 2015 and estimated to cost $32 million. Funding would be provided by the Federal Transit Administration and the Pennsylvania Department of Transportation (PennDOT).

, bidding for site clearing was expected to take place in mid-2016, with the new station opening in 2018. The work includes pedestrian bridges to the platform and over Route 230, and an extension of West Emaus Street to Route 230. By early 2018, the projected opening was delayed to 2022 due to delays with Norfolk Southern and Amtrak relocating their tracks. Despite an August 2021 projection, the station opened on January 10, 2022. A ribbon-cutting ceremony was held on January 18, 2022, with federal, state, and local officials along with Amtrak and PennDOT personnel in attendance.

References

External links 

Planning page for replacement station
Middletown Train station (USA RailGuide -- TrainWeb)

Amtrak stations in Pennsylvania
Transportation buildings and structures in Dauphin County, Pennsylvania
Railway stations in the United States opened in 1990
1990 establishments in Pennsylvania
Philadelphia to Harrisburg Main Line
Former Pennsylvania Railroad stations